Castell de Castells is a municipality high in the mountains of the Marina Alta on the Costa Blanca in southeastern Spain. The village is at the source of the Rio Jalón and surrounded by mountains. It is approximately one hour's drive to the beaches, the Fuentes de Algar, and Terra Mítica theme park. Also in the area are the caves of Vall d'Ebo and Benidoleig.

The remains of the Arabic castle, Penya Castellet, and many trails are found in the area, popular for walking and mountain biking. The area has a rich history with three settlements around the village: Pla de Petracos, Bitla and Pla d'Alt. Travelers can visit Els Arcs' naturally formed arches which are some of the largest natural arches in Europe. The ruins of these settlements are now being rebuilt as modern homes.

Five kilometres outside the village in the area known as Pla de Petracos are ancient cave paintings said to have been painted over 5000 years ago.  Caves at the archaeological site have a viewing platform, and the paintings are explained on six interpretive panels.

There is also a museum in the village open on weekends

The village has a hotel,  many bars, and  restaurants  serving traditional and international dishes. Three places to stay for bed and breakfast or walking holidays.

The restaurants serve international and traditional dishes.

The village butcher sells a large selections of snacks, drinks, local honey, extra virgin Olive Oil, cold pressed in the village press also sausages ( chorizos, Morcilla etc. )  made in the butchers shop from traditional recipes.
    
Three kilometres outside the village is an enormous natural arch, Els Arcs.
Said to be one of the biggest in Europe.

Fiestas 
San Vicente Ferrer: Celebrated at Easter time.
Week of Culture: This event will commence 22nd. July 2022 for about a week.  With poetry readings at the Font d'la Bota, music concerts in the square performed by the village band "La Primitiva", traditional dancing with entertainment for young and old.
Santa Ana:  The 26th. Of July is the day of Santa Ana, patron saint of Castell de Castells.  This is a day of great celebration in the village with a candlelit procession through the streets in the evening. 
Summer Fiesta: Starts on 14 August, with one week of celebrations with events morning, noon and night. A typical Spanish fiesta is very noisy and tends to go on very late at night, so siestas are important in the afternoon, when it is extremely hot. 2022 sees the return of village fiestas. 
Pla de Petracos:  Early in September the village holds a great fiesta under the old trees in the ancient settlement of Petracos.  Trees are lit with fairy lights, then music, food and dancing goes on through the night. On Sunday morning the Saint is carried from the village church to Petracos, about 5;km down the mountain.  Mass is then held under the trees.  Afterwards families gather for an aperitif before cooking their paella’s  in the open air and continuing with the weekend fiesta.

Flora and fauna 
Plants and animals in the area include Narcissus assonanus, Narcissus dubious, Bee Orchids, Ophrys speculum, Venus' Mirror Orchid, Man Orchid, Aceras anthropophorum, Sombre Bee, Ophrys fusca Sawfly, Phrys tenthredinifera and Woodcock, Ophrys scolopax, also the Yellow Bee Orchid Ophrys lutea, the very rare Orchis italica, Fritillaria hispanica, and Dictamnus.  Tulips include Tulipa australis.

References

External links 

 Castell de Castells
 Town Hall web site

Towns in Spain
Natural arches